One Last Time may refer to:

Songs
 "One Last Time" (Agnes song), 2012
 "One Last Time" (Ariana Grande song), 2014
 "One Last Time" (Dusty Drake song), 2003
 "One Last Time" (Hamilton song), from Hamilton: An American Musical, 2015
 "(Let's Get Together) One Last Time", by Tammy Wynette, 1977
 "All of Me" (John Legend song), briefly retitled "One Last Time", 2013
 "One Last Time", by Arjun
 "One Last Time", by Bonnie Pink from One
 "One Last Time", by Dream Theater from Metropolis Pt. 2: Scenes from a Memory
 "One Last Time", by Edie Brickell & New Bohemians from Stranger Things 
 "One Last Time", by Elise Estrada from Elise Estrada
 "One Last Time", by Girls' Generation from Holiday Night
 "One Last Time", by Glen Campbell from Glen Travis Campbell
 "One Last Time", by Gromee
 "One Last Time", by HIM from Razorblade Romance
 "One Last Time", by K-Ci & JoJo from X
 "One Last Time", by Kellie Pickler from Kellie Pickler
 "One Last Time", by Mumzy Stranger and Stevie Hoang
 "One Last Time", by Simon Webbe from Smile
 "One Last Time", by Westlife from Spectrum

Television episodes
 "One Last Thing" (Homeland) or "One Last Time", a 2013 episode of Homeland
 "One Last Time", a 2019 episode of Good Girls

See also
 One Last Time Live in Concert, a 2001 documentary featuring Tina Turner
 Live – One Last Time, a 2007 album by The Clark Sisters
 "Just One Last Time", a song by David Guetta
 One Last Time: An Evening with Tony Bennett and Lady Gaga, a 2021 television special starring American singers Tony Bennett and Lady Gaga